Surprise! Surprise! is an Australian television series which aired in 1972 on the 0-10 Network (later Network Ten). It was a daytime game show hosted by Tommy Hanlon Jr. who was assisted by Ian Turpie. 

A review in The Age felt that the show did not properly utilise Tommy Hanlon Jr's talents, and described the show as being similar to his earlier series It Could Be You.

References

External links
 

1972 Australian television series debuts
1972 Australian television series endings
Network 10 original programming
1970s Australian game shows
Black-and-white Australian television shows
English-language television shows
Television game shows with incorrect disambiguation